The Derrydale Press was an American book publishing company founded in 1927 with headquarters on Park Ave. in Manhattan, New York. It was the creation of Princeton University graduate Eugene V. Connett III (1891–1969). He told Time magazine that he got the Derrydale name, "from a bottle of whiskey and a map of Ireland."

An important publisher of outdoor books for North American audiences during the first half of the 20th century, according to a 1938 Time magazine article, it was the only publishing house in the world devoted exclusively to sporting books.

The company went out of business in 1942. Its archives are held by Princeton University. The name was resurrected in the 1990s and the Derrydale Press is currently operated as an imprint of the Rowman & Littlefield Publishing Group of Lanham, Maryland which uses it to put out books on the outdoors as well as hunting, fishing, horse sports, hiking, and sporting art.

References

External links
 The Derrydale Press at The Rowman & Littlefield Publishing Group website
 December 19, 1938 Time magazine article on Derrydale Press (subscription required)
 Henry A. Siegel, Harry C. Marschalk, Jr., and Isaac Oelgart, The Derrydale Press: A Bibliography. Goshen, CT: The Angler's & Shooters Press, 1981. xii, 267 pages. Limited to 1250 copies.

Book publishing companies of the United States
Book publishing companies based in New York City
Publishing companies established in 1927